Sundeved is a peninsula on the east coast of the Jutland peninsula in south Denmark. It lies between Åbenrå Fjord and Als Fjord to the north, Alssund to the east and Flensborg Fjord to the south. The westernmost part of the city of Sønderborg is located on the peninsula. Most of Sønderborg is on the island of Als.

Until December 31, 2006 Sundeved was also the name of a municipality in the former South Jutland County  The municipality covered an area of 69 km2, and had a total population of 5,298 (2005).  Its last mayor was John Solkær Pedersen.

The main town and the site of its municipal council was the town of Sønderborg, in neighboring Sønderborg municipality.  Towns in the municipality included Avnbøl, Ballebro, Blans, Stenderup, Ullerup, Vester Sottrup, and Øster Sottrup.

Ferry service connects the former municipality at the town of Ballebro over Als Fjord to the town of Hardeshøj.

 Nybøl Parish
 Sottrup (German:Satrup) Parish
 Ullerup (German:Ulderup) Parish

Sundeved municipality ceased to exist as the result of Kommunalreformen ("The Municipality Reform" of 2007).  It was combined with existing Augustenborg, Broager, Gråsten, Nordborg, Sydals, and Sønderborg municipalities to form the new Sønderborg Municipality.  This created a municipality with an area of 499 km2 and a total population of over 70,000 people (2005).  The new municipality belongs to the new Region of Southern Denmark.

Notable people 
 Johannes Gelert (1852 in Nybøl – 1923) a Danish-born sculptor, who emigrated to the United States in 1887
 Otto Gelert (1862 in Nybøl on Sundeved peninsula – 1899) a Danish pharmacist and botanist, who specialized in plant floristics and systematics

External links 
 Sønderborg municipality's official website (Danish only)
 Tourism information

References 
 Municipal statistics: NetBorger Kommunefakta, delivered from KMD aka Kommunedata (Municipal Data)
 Municipal mergers and neighbors: Eniro new municipalities map

Former municipalities of Denmark
Peninsulas of Denmark
Peninsulas of the Baltic Sea
Geography of Sønderborg Municipality